Isara turtoni is a species of sea snail, a marine gastropod mollusk, in the family Mitridae, the miters or miter snails.

References

turtoni
Gastropods described in 1890